Gymnocranius griseus, commonly known as the grey large-eye bream, or sliver sea bream, is a species of marine fish native to the Indian and western Pacific Oceans.
Grey large-eye bream are known as Meichidai (目一鯛/メイチダイ) in Japan.

References

External links
 
 Grey Seabream @ Fishes of Australia

Lethrinidae
Marine fish of Southeast Asia
Marine fish of Northern Australia
Fish described in 1843